Wendelmoet Claesdochter ( – 20 November 1527) was a Dutch Lutheran who was executed for heresy by strangulation followed by burning, and is known as the first woman victim to the religious persecutions in the Netherlands during the reign of Emperor Charles V.

She was a leading figure in spreading the protestantism in Monnickendam through bible meetings. She was used in propaganda as a protestant martyr, and appeared in the protestant martyrs book Het offer des Heeren since the 1570 edition.

References 

 Kloek, E. (2014). Claesdr., Wendelmoet (?–1527). Digitaal Vrouwenlexicon van Nederland.

External links 
 

16th-century Dutch people
1490s births
1527 deaths
Executed Dutch people
Executed Dutch women
People executed by Spain by burning
People executed for heresy
People from Monnickendam
Year of birth uncertain
People of the Protestant Reformation